Kalininskyi District is an urban district of the city of Donetsk, Ukraine, named after a Soviet political figure Mikhail Kalinin.

Places

External links
 Kalinin Raion at the Mayor of Donetsk website
 Kalinin Raion at the Uzovka website

Urban districts of Donetsk